Andrew Jonathan Penny MBE (born 4 December 1952, Kingston upon Hull, East Riding of Yorkshire, England) is an English conductor. He has recorded a complete cycle of Malcolm Arnold's symphonies.

From 1982 to 2022, he was Musical Director of the Hull Philharmonic Orchestra. In November 1999 he directed two performances of Gustav Mahler's Symphony No. 8 (The Symphony of a Thousand), as part of the Millennium celebrations in Hull.

He was appointed Member of the Order of the British Empire (MBE) in the 2014 Birthday Honours for services to music.

References

English conductors (music)
British male conductors (music)
Living people
Members of the Order of the British Empire
Musicians from Kingston upon Hull
21st-century British conductors (music)
21st-century British male musicians
1952 births